is a tactical role-playing video game developed and published by Capcom for the Game Boy Advance. A spin-off of the Onimusha series, it is the first and only game in the series to be released for a Nintendo system. It does not follow the storyline of the previous PlayStation 2 games and is considered a side story. However, the game features a similar plot: a samurai who possesses the Oni Gauntlet can become the Onimusha and fights against Nobunaga and his army of genma.

Gameplay 
The player is presented with a 3/4 camera view of a detailed gridded battlefield. The point of the game is to defeat the opposing team of opponents and improve the player character with experience points gained in battle by defeating enemies. Such statistics include strength, which dictates attack power, speed which decides turn order, and others. The game allows the player to equip their warrior with katanas, spears, and other weapons.

Characters 
The samurai is Onimaru, who is supported by a wide range of characters, many of whom are the same as their PlayStation 2 equivalents. However, there are some returning characters from other Onimusha games such as Saika Magoichi, Ankokuji Ekei, Fūma Kotarō, and Akechi Mitsuhide. Onimaru battles the genma until you ultimately reach the notorious Nobunaga. New to the series are additional chosen warriors who receive the power of the phoenix, tortoise, tiger and dragon to assist Onimaru. These animals correspond with the Chinese celestial animals that represent the Cardinal directions. This reference was also a puzzle in Onimusha 2: Samurai's Destiny.

Reception 

Onimusha Tactics received "mixed or average reviews", according to review aggregator Metacritic.

Notes

References

External links 
 

2003 video games
Game Boy Advance games
Onimusha
Tactical role-playing video games
Sengoku video games
Video games about samurai
Video games developed in Japan
Video games scored by Keiji Yamagishi
Video games with isometric graphics
Video games set in feudal Japan
Virtual Console games
Virtual Console games for Wii U